Ash Wednesday is a Christian religious holiday.

Ash Wednesday may also refer to creative works:
Ash Wednesday (1925 film), a German silent film
Ash Wednesday (1931 film), a German drama film
Ash Wednesday (1958 film), a Mexican film
Ash Wednesday (1973 film), a film starring Elizabeth Taylor
Ash Wednesday (2002 film), a crime drama starring Edward Burns, Elijah Wood, and Rosario Dawson
Ash Wednesday (musician), Australian musician
Ash Wednesday (album), a 2007 album by Elvis Perkins
"Ash Wednesday" (poem), a 1930 poem by T.S. Eliot

See also
Ash Wednesday fires, a 1983 series of bushfires in Australia
Ash Wednesday Storm of 1962
2001 Nisqually earthquake or Ash Wednesday Quake